

This page lists board and card games, wargames, miniatures games, and tabletop role-playing games published in 1974.  For video games, see 1974 in video gaming.

Games released or invented in 1974

Game awards given in 1974
Charles S. Roberts Award for Best Professional Game of 1974: Rise and Decline of the Third Reich

Significant games-related events of 1974
West End Games founded.

References

See also
 1974 in video gaming

Games
Games by year